Top-down proteomics is a method of protein identification that either uses an ion trapping mass spectrometer to store an isolated protein ion for mass measurement and tandem mass spectrometry (MS/MS) analysis or other protein purification methods such as two-dimensional gel electrophoresis in conjunction with MS/MS. Top-down proteomics is capable of identifying and quantitating unique proteoforms through the analysis of intact proteins. The name is derived from the similar approach to DNA sequencing. During mass spectrometry intact proteins are typically ionized by electrospray ionization and trapped in a Fourier transform ion cyclotron resonance (Penning trap), quadrupole ion trap (Paul trap) or Orbitrap mass spectrometer. Fragmentation for tandem mass spectrometry is accomplished by electron-capture dissociation or electron-transfer dissociation. Effective fractionation is critical for sample handling before mass-spectrometry-based proteomics. Proteome analysis routinely involves digesting intact proteins followed by inferred protein identification using mass spectrometry (MS). Top-down MS (non-gel) proteomics interrogates protein structure through measurement of an intact mass followed by direct ion dissociation in the gas phase.

Advantages 
 The main advantages of the top-down approach include the ability to detect degradation products, protein isoforms, sequence variants, combinations of post-translational modifications as well as simplified processes for data normalization and quantitation.
 Top-down proteomics, when accompanied with polyacrylamide gel electrophoresis, can help to complement the bottom-up proteomic approach. Top-down proteomic methods can assist in exposing large deviations from predictions and has been very successfully pursued by combining Gel Elution Liquid-based Fractionation Entrapment Electrophoresis fractionation, protein precipitation, and reverse phase HPLC with electrospray ionization and MS/MS.
 Characterization of small proteins represents a significant challenge for bottom up proteomics due to the inability to generate sufficient tryptic peptides for analysis. Top-down proteomics allows for low mass protein detection, thus increasing the repertoire of proteins known. While Bottom-up proteomics integrates cleaved products from all proteoforms produced by a gene into a single peptide map of the full-length gene product to tabulate and quantify expressed proteins, a major strength of Top-down proteomics is that it enables researchers to quantitatively track one or more proteoforms from multiple samples and to excise these proteoforms for chemical analysis.

Disadvantages 
 In the recent past, the top down approach was relegated to analysis of individual proteins or simple mixtures, while complex mixtures and proteins were analyzed by more established methods such as Bottom-up proteomics. Additionally protein identification and proteoform characterization in the TDP (Top-down proteomics) approach can suffer from a dynamic range challenge where the same highly abundant species are repeatedly fragmented.
 Although Top-down proteomics can be operated in relatively high output in order to successfully map proteome coverage at a large level, the rate of identifying new proteins after initial rounds reduces quite sharply.
 Top-down proteomics interrogation can overcome problems for identifying individual proteins, but has not been achieved on a large scale due to a lack of intact protein fractionation methods that are integrated with tandem mass spectrometry.

Research and uses 
Study One: Quantitation and Identification of Thousands of Human Proteoforms below 30 kDa
 Researchers performed a study of human proteoforms below 30kDa, used primary IMR90 human fibroblasts containing a Ras function construct that were grown in medium.
 Chose to use Top-Down Proteomics to characterize these proteoforms because it is currently the best method for intact proteins, as I discussed Bottom Up digests the protein and does not do a good job of providing a clear image of distinct intact proteoforms.
 Top Down Proteomics is capable of identifying and quantitating unique proteoforms through the analysis of intact proteins. The Top-down quantitation yielded changes in abundance of 1038 cytoplasmic proteoforms.
Study Two: Combining high-throughput MALDI-TOF mass spectrometry and isoelectric focusing gel electrophoresis for virtual 2D gel-based proteomics
 Researchers used top-down proteomics because could identify the exact proteoforms of intact proteins, rather than the bottom-up approach which gives fragment ions of peptides.
 This study used Virtual 2D gel along with Mass Spectrometry in order to separate protein mixtures. MALDI is a computer software that generates the intact masses of the proteins at each isoelectric point. It started with an image of an IPG-IEF (isoelectric focusing) gel selection that was then analyzed by MALDI.
 Top-down proteomics MALDI-TOF/TOF-MS is more tolerant to impurities; does not require biomarker extraction, purification, and separation; and can be directly applied to intact microorganisms.

See also
Protein mass spectrometry
Bottom-up proteomics
Shotgun proteomics
Tandem mass spectrometry (MS/MS)

References

Bibliography

Mass spectrometry
Proteomics